Malye Udoly is a rural locality (a village) in Gorod Vyazniki, Vyaznikovsky District, Vladimir Oblast, Russia. The population was 72 as of 2010.

Geography 
Malye Udoly is located on the Istok River, 11 km northeast of Vyazniki (the district's administrative centre) by road. Bolshiye Udoly is the nearest rural locality.

References 

Rural localities in Vyaznikovsky District